Hallie Crawford Stillwell was an American teacher,rancher,lecturer, and author.

Life and career
Stillwell was born in Waco, Texas on October 20, 1897. 

In 1910, she moved to Alpine with her family. 

In 1916, she took up her first teaching position, at age 19, at a school in Presidio, Texas. She taught school children with her fathers gun strapped to her hip and her salary included a hazard job supplement due to the classroom being within pistol range of Pancho Villa’s Revolutionary Army. A year later, in 1917, she transferred to Marathon, Texas.

It was in Marathon that she met and on July 29, 1918, married Roy Stillwell, a local rancher.  The couple lived in a primitive one room cabin on the Stillwell Ranch, a 6,500 Acre cattle ranch located North East of present day Big Bend National Park.

Hallie worked along side her husband, learning to herd and brand cattle, mend fences and hunt game. She recalled this time of her life as learning “…to live, work, and act like a man.”

During the 1930’s Dust Bowl the Stillwell Ranch experienced an extreme drought that nearly bankrupted the ranch if not for hard work, determination and assistance from the Drought Relief Service.

In 1955, she started to write a column for the Alpine Avalanche.

In 1992, she was included in National Cowgirl Hall of Fame.

Hallie Stillwell Hall of Fame Museum is named after her.

Recogition
 National Cowgirl Hall of Fame

References

1897 births
1997 deaths
Schoolteachers from Texas
American writers
Ranchers
People from Waco, Texas
20th-century American women educators
20th-century American educators